Select Records is an American record label. Among its most popular acts were the Real Roxanne, Chubb Rock, AMG, The Jerky Boys, Kid 'n Play, UTFO, Whistle, and Gary Private. From 1990 to 1995, it had a distribution deal with Elektra Records and is still distributed by the Warner Music Group's Alternative Distribution Alliance. It also had a dance-music sub-label called Active Records.

Selected discography
1982: Gary Private: Reach Out
1985: UTFO: UTFO
1986: UTFO: Skeezer Pleezer
1986: Whistle: Whistle
1987: Whistle: Transformation
1988: Whistle: Always and Forever
1988: Kid 'n Play: 2 Hype
1988: The Real Roxanne: The Real Roxanne
1988: Chubb Rock: Chubb Rock & Howie Tee
1988: Damien: Every Dog Has Its Day
1989: Chubb Rock: And the Winner Is?
1989: Steve X Get Ill: Hey Buddy Buddy 
1989: Damien: Stop This War
1990: Whistle: Get The Love
1990: Kid 'n Play: Kid 'n Play's Funhouse
1990: Style: In Tone We Trust
1991: Chubb Rock: The One
1991: Kid 'n Play: Face the Nation
1991: Godfather Don: Hazardous
1991: The A.T.E.E.M.: A Hero Ain't Nothin' But a Sandwich
1992: AMG: Bitch Betta Have My Money
1992: Chubb Rock: I Gotta Get Mine Yo
1992: Red Hot Lover Tone: Red Hot Lover Tone
1992: Brothers Uv Da Blakmarket: Ruff Life
1994: M.O.P.: To the Death
1994: Red Hot Lover Tone: #1 Player
1995: AMG: Ballin Outta Control
1995: Hulk Hogan And The Wrestling Boot Band: Hulk Rules
1995: King Just: Mystics of the God
1997: Chubb Rock: The Mind
2002: Jerky Boys: The Best of the Jerky Boys

External links
 

Record labels established in 1981
American independent record labels
Pop record labels
Hip hop record labels
Rock record labels
Electronic dance music record labels